The 2021 Basketball League of Serbia playoffs are the play-off tournament that decides the winner of the 2020–21 Basketball League of Serbia season. The playoffs is scheduled to start on 27 May and end on 13 June 2021.

Qualified teams

Personnel and sponsorship

Bracket

Quarterfinals 
The quarterfinals are scheduled between 27 May–1 June 2021. Crvena zvezda played the 2021 ABA League Playoffs so their games were rescheduled.

|}

Game 1

Game 2

Semifinals 

|}

Game 1

Game 2

Game 3

Finals 

|}

Game 1

Game 2

Game 3

See also 
 List of current Basketball League of Serbia team rosters
 2021 ABA League First Division Playoffs

 Teams
 2020–21 KK Crvena zvezda season
 2020–21 KK Partizan season

References

External links 
 Official website 
 Serbian League at Eurobasket.com

playoffs
2020–21 in Serbian basketball
Basketball League of Serbia playoffs